Ashimi or Hashim bin Umar al-Kanemi  (1840s-1893) was Shehu of Borno from ca.1885 to 1893.

Reign of Ashimi
Ashimi became Shehu of Borno in 1885 at the death of his brother Ibrahim Kura. As it had already been the case for his two predecessors, his reign was marked by an intense political and economical crisis in Kukawa. A French army officer who met Ashimi in 1892 believed that he had little direct involvement with the running of the kingdom; he also reported that the Shehu seemed pious, rather scholarly, and was someone who hated the thought of war.

In 1893, Ashimi lost two battles against Rabih az-Zubayr who was trying to invade Borno. His nephew Kyari, who was chosen to become the new Shehu, assassinated him in N'galagati near Geidam.

Dynasty

Footnotes

Bibliography
 Adeleye, Rowland, Power and Diplomacy in Northern Nigeria: 1804-1906, the Sokoto Caliphate and Its Enemies (London: Longman Group, 1971).
 Amegboh, Joseph, and Cécile Clairval, Rabah: Conquérant Des Pays Tchadiens, Grandes Figures Africaines (Paris: Dakar ; Abidjan : Nouvelles Éditions Africaines, 1976).
 Barth, Heinrich, Travels and Discoveries in North and Central Africa (London: Longman, 1857).
 Brenner, Louis, The Shehus of Kukawa: A History of the Al-Kanemi Dynasty of Bornu, Oxford Studies in African Affairs (Oxford, Clarendon Press, 1973).
 Cohen, Ronald, The Kanuri of Bornu, Case Studies in Cultural Anthropology (New York: Holt, 1967).
 Flint, John Edgar, Sir George Goldie and the Making of Nigeria, West African History Series (London: Oxford University Press, 1960).
 Hallam, W. K. R., The Life and Times of Rabih Fadl Allah (Ilfracombe: Stockwell, 1977).
 Hallam, W. K. R., ‘Rabih: His Place in History’, Borno Museum Society Newsletter, 15-16 (1993), 5-22.
 Horowitz, Michael M., ‘Ba Karim: An Account of Rabeh’s Wars’, African Historical Studies, 3 (1970), 391-402 .
 Lange, Dierk, 'The kingdoms and peoples of Chad', in General history of Africa, ed. by Djibril Tamsir Niane, IV (London: Unesco, Heinemann, 1984), pp. 238–265.
 Last, Murray, ‘Le Califat De Sokoto Et Borno’, in Histoire Generale De l'Afrique, Rev. ed. (Paris: Presence Africaine, 1986), pp. 599–646.
 Lavers, John, "The Al- Kanimiyyin Shehus: a Working Chronology" in Berichte des Sonderforschungsbereichs, 268, Bd. 2, Frankfurt a. M. 1993: 179-186.
 Mohammed, Kyari, Borno in the Rabih Years, 1893-1901: The Rise and Crash of a Predatory State (Maiduguri Nigeria: University of Maiduguri, 2006).
 Monteil, P. L., De Saint-Louis À Tripoli Par Le Lac Tchad Voyage Au Travers Du Soudan Et Du Sahara, Accompli Pendant Les Années 1890-1892 (Paris: Germer Baillière, 1895).
 Nachtigal, Gustav, Sahara und Sudan: Ergebnisse Sechsjähriger Reisen in Afrika (Berlin: Weidmann, 1879).
 
 Palmer, Herbert Richmond, The Bornu Sahara and Sudan (London: John Murray, 1936).
 
 Tilho, Jean Auguste Marie, Tilho Mission, and France Ministère des Colonies, Documents Scientifiques De La Mission Tilho (1906–1909) (Paris: Imprimerie Nationale, 1910).

External links
 Kanuri Studies Association

Royalty of Borno
1840s births
1893 deaths
19th-century rulers in Africa
19th-century Nigerian people